The second season of the TV Land's original sitcom The Exes premiered on June 20, 2012. A total of 12 episodes were produced for the second season. The series stars Donald Faison, Wayne Knight, Kristen Johnston, David Alan Basche and Kelly Stables.

Cast
 Donald Faison as Phil Chase
 Wayne Knight as Haskell Lutz
 David Alan Basche as Stuart Gardner
 Kelly Stables as Eden Konkler
 Kristen Johnston as Holly Franklin

Production
On February 2, 2012, TV Land renewed The Exes for a second season, set to premiere on June 20, 2012, at 10:30pm following The Soul Man. Season two was set to have 12 episodes, to coincide with the first season of The Soul Man.

In April 2012, People magazine reported that Kelly Stables (Eden) and husband Kurt Patino were expecting their first child, due in the fall. TV Land stated that her pregnancy will be written into the show. Guest stars for season two include, Kathleen Rose Perkins as Dr. Carol Thomas, Garcelle Beauvais as Kendra, James Morrison as Mr. Hubner, Holly's boss, Erin Matthews as Joan, Mr. Hubner's wife, Maksim Chmerkovskiy as Don, Janet Varney as Lorna, Stuart's ex-wife, Paula Jai Parker as Amelia, Michael Voltaggio as himself, Dot-Marie Jones, Amanda Detmer as Jill, Holly's sister, Zach Braff as Chuck Feeney, and Todd Stashwick as Grant, Phil's pretentious boss. Guest stars returning from the first season include: Diedrich Bader as Paul, Holly's co-worker/romantic interest, and Judith Light as Marjorie, Holly's mother.

Episodes

References

External links
 

2012 American television seasons